Kevin Conneff (born 8 January 1945) is an Irish singer and musician. He is best known as the lead singer and bodhrán player of Irish folk group; The Chieftains. He joined the group in 1976 after contributing to their album The Chieftains 6: Bonaparte's Retreat.

Conneff was born and raised in the Donore Avenue area in Dublin. Music was an important part of his home life but; as he later related, "I didn't hear traditional music from the womb," as did other members of the Chieftains. It was not until he began work as a photographic assistant for a printing machine company, at age 18, that he was introduced to Irish traditional music. A group of his work colleagues would hire a car every week to drive to local fleadhs (traditional Irish music festivals). Conneff began attending weekend jam sessions, occasionally joining the musicians for some songs. He was heavily influenced by the traditional style of singing from the Donegal/Fermanagh region in Ireland, particularly the singing of Paddy Tunney. Around this time, he took up the bodhrán after hearing one on the radio, including the playing of Seán Ó Riada with Ceoltóirí Chualann, and was amazed at the power of the simple goatskin Irish frame drum.

Conneff soon mastered the bodhrán and began playing and singing at sessions about Ireland, along with playing with Dublin traditional music circles. For many years, he helped run the Tradition Club, a haven for traditional musicians, including future Chieftains colleagues Paddy Moloney, Seán Keane and Michael Tubridy. In the early 1970s, he joined Christy Moore for what became a benchmark album, Prosperous. Prior to joining the Chieftains, he maintained his printing job, also looking after his elderly mother.

Conneff has three children, Peigí, Ruairí and Ella, and lives in Hollywood, County Wicklow.

References

1945 births
Living people
Bodhrán players
Claddagh Records artists
Irish folk musicians
Irish folk singers
Musicians from Dublin (city)
The Chieftains members